Timothy Dreesen (born 30 January 1987 in Geel) is a Belgian professional footballer who plays as a centre back for KSAV St. Dimpna.

Dreesen signed for Scottish club Ross County in July 2014. He was released from his contract in November 2014.

References

External links
 Voetbal International profile 
Footgoal Profile

Tim Dreesen at Footballdatabase

Belgian footballers
Belgian expatriate footballers
Living people
1987 births
Lierse S.K. players
Club Brugge KV players
Sint-Truidense V.V. players
KFC Turnhout players
Fortuna Sittard players
Eerste Divisie players
Ross County F.C. players
K.F.C. Dessel Sport players
Scottish Professional Football League players
Belgian expatriate sportspeople in the Netherlands
Belgian expatriate sportspeople in Scotland
Expatriate footballers in the Netherlands
Expatriate footballers in Scotland
Association football defenders
People from Geel
Footballers from Antwerp Province